Edmund Wilson Jr. (May 8, 1895 – June 12, 1972) was an American writer, literary critic and journalist. He is widely regarded as one of the most important literary critics of the 20th century. Wilson began his career as a journalist, writing for publications such as Vanity Fair and The New Yorker. He helped to edit The New Republic, served as chief book critic for The New Yorker, and was a frequent contributor to The New York Review of Books. Wilson was the author of more than twenty books, including Axel's Castle, Patriotic Gore, and a work of fiction, Memoirs of Hecate County. He was a friend of many notable figures of the time, including F. Scott Fitzgerald, Ernest Hemingway, and John Dos Passos. His scheme for a Library of America series of national classic works came to fruition through the efforts of Jason Epstein after Wilson's death. He was a two-time winner of the National Book Award and received the Presidential Medal of Freedom in 1964.

Early life
Wilson was born in Red Bank, New Jersey. His parents were Edmund Wilson Sr., a lawyer who served as New Jersey Attorney General, and Helen Mather (née Kimball). Wilson attended The Hill School, a college preparatory boarding school in Pottstown, Pennsylvania, graduating in 1912.  At Hill, Wilson served as the editor-in-chief of the school's literary magazine, The Record. From 1912 to 1916, he was educated at Princeton University, where his friends included F. Scott Fitzgerald and war poet John Allan Wyeth. Wilson began his professional writing career as a reporter for the New York Sun, and served in the army with Base Hospital 36 from Detroit, Michigan, and later as a translator during the First World War. His family's summer home at Talcottville, New York, known as Edmund Wilson House, was listed on the National Register of Historic Places in 1973.

Career
Wilson was the managing editor of Vanity Fair in 1920 and 1921, and later served as associate editor of The New Republic and as a book reviewer for The New Yorker and The New York Review of Books. His works influenced novelists Upton Sinclair, John Dos Passos, Sinclair Lewis, Floyd Dell, and Theodore Dreiser. He served on the Dewey Commission that set out to fairly evaluate the charges that led to the exile of Leon Trotsky. He wrote plays, poems, and novels, but his greatest influence was literary criticism.

Axel's Castle: A Study in the Imaginative Literature of 1870–1930 (1931) was a sweeping survey of Symbolism. It covered Arthur Rimbaud, Auguste Villiers de l'Isle-Adam (author of Axël), W. B. Yeats, Paul Valéry, T. S. Eliot, Marcel Proust, James Joyce, and Gertrude Stein.

In 1932, Wilson pledged his support to the Communist Party USA's candidate for President, William Z. Foster, signing a manifesto in support of CPUSA policies; however, Wilson did not identify personally as a communist. In his book To the Finland Station (1940), Wilson studied the course of European socialism, from the 1824 discovery by Jules Michelet of the ideas of Vico to the 1917 arrival of Vladimir Lenin at the Finland Station of Saint Petersburg to lead the Bolsheviks in the Russian Revolution.

In an essay on the work of horror writer H. P. Lovecraft, "Tales of the Marvellous and the Ridiculous" (New Yorker, November 1945; later collected in Classics and Commercials), Wilson condemned Lovecraft's tales as "hackwork". Wilson is also well known for his heavy criticism of J. R. R. Tolkien's work The Lord of the Rings, which he referred to as "juvenile trash", saying "Dr. Tolkien has little skill at narrative and no instinct for literary form." He had earlier dismissed the work of W. Somerset Maugham in vehement terms (without, as he later boasted, having troubled to read the novels generally regarded as Maugham's finest, Of Human Bondage, Cakes and Ale and The Razor's Edge).

In 1964, Wilson was awarded The Edward MacDowell Medal by The MacDowell Colony for outstanding contributions to American culture. 

Wilson lobbied for the creation of a series of classic U.S. literature similar to France's Bibliothèque de la Pléiade. In 1982, ten years after his death, The Library of America series was launched.  Wilson's writing was included in the Library of America in two volumes published in 2007.

Peers and relationships
Wilson's critical works helped foster public appreciation for several novelists: Ernest Hemingway, John Dos Passos, William Faulkner, F. Scott Fitzgerald, and Vladimir Nabokov. He was instrumental in establishing the modern evaluation of the works of Dickens and Kipling. Wilson was a friend of the novelist and playwright Susan Glaspell as well as the philosopher Isaiah Berlin.

He attended Princeton with Fitzgerald, a year-and-a-half his junior. In 1936 in the "Crack-Up" essays, Fitzgerald referred to Wilson as his "intellectual conscience ... [f]or twenty years". After Fitzgerald's early death (at the age of 44) from a heart attack in December 1940, Wilson edited two books by Fitzgerald (The Last Tycoon and The Crack-Up) for posthumous publication, donating his editorial services to help Fitzgerald's family. Wilson was also a friend of Nabokov, with whom he corresponded extensively and whose writing he introduced to Western audiences.  However, their friendship was marred by Wilson's cool reaction to Nabokov's Lolita and irretrievably damaged by Wilson's public criticism of what he considered Nabokov's eccentric translation of Pushkin's Eugene Onegin.

Wilson had multiple marriages and affairs.
 His first wife was Mary Blair, who had been in Eugene O'Neill's theatrical company. Their daughter, Rosalind Baker Wilson, was born on September 19, 1923.
 His second wife was Margaret Canby.  After her death in a freak accident two years after their marriage, Wilson wrote a long eulogy to her and said later that he felt guilt over having neglected her. Wilson, despondent over Canby's death, moved to a rundown townhouse at 314 East 53rd Street in Manhattan for several years.
 From 1938 to 1946, he was married to Mary McCarthy, who like Wilson was well known as a literary critic. She enormously admired Wilson's breadth and depth of intellect, and they collaborated on numerous works. In an article in The New Yorker, Louis Menand wrote, "The marriage to McCarthy was a mistake that neither side wanted to be first to admit. When they fought, he would retreat into his study and lock the door; she would set piles of paper on fire and try to push them under it." This marriage resulted in the birth of their son, Reuel Wilson (born December 25, 1938).
 His fourth wife was Elena Mumm Thornton. Their daughter, Helen Miranda Wilson, was born February 19, 1948.

He wrote many letters to Anaïs Nin, criticizing her for her surrealistic style, because it was opposed to the realism that was then deemed correct writing, and he ended by asking for her hand — "I would love to be married to you, and I would teach you to write" — which she took as an insult. Except for a brief falling-out following the publication of I Thought of Daisy, in which Wilson portrayed Edna St Vincent Millay as Rita Cavanaugh, Wilson and Millay remained friends throughout life. He later married Elena Mumm Thornton (previously married to James Worth Thornton), but continued to have extramarital relationships.

Cold War
Wilson was also an outspoken critic of US Cold War policies. He refused to pay his federal income tax from 1946 to 1955 and was later investigated by the Internal Revenue Service. After a settlement, Wilson received a $25,000 fine, rather than the original $69,000 sought by the IRS. He received no jail time. In his book The Cold War and the Income Tax: A Protest (1963), Wilson argued that as a result of competitive militarization against the Soviet Union, the civil liberties of Americans were being paradoxically infringed under the guise of defense from Communism. For those reasons, Wilson also opposed involvement in the Vietnam War.

Selected by John F. Kennedy to receive the Presidential Medal of Freedom, Wilson, in absentia, was officially awarded the medal on December 6, 1963, by President Lyndon Johnson. However, Wilson's view of Johnson was decidedly negative. Historian Eric F. Goldman writes in his memoir The Tragedy of Lyndon Johnson that when Goldman, on behalf of Johnson, invited Wilson to read from his writings at a White House Festival of the Arts in 1965, "Wilson declined with a brusqueness that I never experienced before or after in the case of an invitation in the name of the President and First Lady."

For the academic year 1964–65, he was a Fellow on the faculty in the Center for Advanced Studies at Wesleyan University.

"Edmund Wilson regrets..."
Throughout his career, Wilson often answered fan mail and outside requests for his time with this form postcard:

Bibliography

Non-Fiction 
 The Undertaker's Garland, (with John Peale Bishop), 1922
 Poets, Farewell!, New York, NY: Charles Scribners's Sons, 1929
 Axel's Castle: A Study in the Imaginative Literature of 1870–1930, New York, NY:  Charles Scribner's Sons, 1931
 The American Jitters: A Year of the Slump, New York, NY:  Charles Scribner's Sons, 1932
 Travels In Two Democracies, New York, NY:  Harcourt Brace, 1936
 The Triple Thinkers: Ten Essays on Literature, New York:  Harcourt, Brace & Co, 1938
 To the Finland Station: A Study in the Writing and Acting of History, Garden City, NY: Doubleday, 1940
 The Wound and the Bow: Seven Studies in Literature, Cambridge, MA:  Riverside Press, 1941
 The Boys in the Back Room, Colt Press, 1941
 The Shock of Recognition: The Development of Literature in the U.S. Recorded by the Men Who Made It (editor), New York, NY: Modern Library, 1943. Illustrations (one-volume edition) by Robert F. Hallock.
 Volume I. The Nineteenth Century
 Volume II. The Twentieth Century
 Europe without Baedeker: Sketches among the Ruins of Italy, Greece and England, 1947 (reissued 1967, as shown below)
 .
 .
 .
 Eight Essays, Garden City, NY: Doubleday, 1954
 The Scrolls from the Dead Sea, Fontana, 1955
 Red, Black, Blond, and Olive: Studies in Four Civilizations: Zuni, Haiti, Soviet Russia, Israel, London: W. H. Allen & Co.; New York: Oxford University Press, 1956
 A Piece of My Mind: Reflections at Sixty, New York, NY: Farrar, Straus & Cudahy, 1956
 The American Earthquake: A Documentary of the Twenties and Thirties (A Documentary of the Jazz Age, the Great Depression, and the New Deal), Garden City, NY: Doubleday, 1958
 Apologies to the Iroquois, New York, NY: Vintage, 1960
 Night Thoughts, New York, NY: Farrar, Straus and Cudahy, 1961
 Patriotic Gore: Studies in the Literature of the American Civil War, New York, NY: Farrar, Straus and Giroux, 1962. The title "Patriotic Gore" was taken from the song "Maryland, My Maryland".
 The Cold War and the Income Tax:  A protest, New York, NY: Farrar, Straus & Co., 1964
 O Canada: An American's Notes on Canadian Culture, New York, NY: Farrar, Straus & Co., 1965
 The Bit Between My Teeth: A Literary Chronicle of 1950–1965, New York, NY: Farrar, Straus and Giroux, 1966
 A Prelude: Landscapes, characters and conversations from the earlier years of my life, New York, NY: Farrar, Straus and Giroux, 1967
 The Fruits of the MLA, New York, NY: New York Review, 1968
 Europe without Baedeker: Sketches among the Ruins of Italy, Greece and England, with Notes from a European Diary: 1963–64: Paris, Rome, Budapest, London: Rupert Hart-Davis, 1967
 The Dead Sea Scrolls, 1947–1969, Oxford University Press, 1969, 
 Upstate: Records and Recollections of Northern New York, New York, NY: Farrar, Straus and Giroux, 1971
 Window on Russia: For Use of Foreign Readers, New York, NY: Farrar, Straus and Giroux, 1972
 The Devils and Canon Barham; Ten Essays on Poets, Novelists and Monsters, New York, NY:  Farrar, Straus and Giroux, 1973
 The Twenties: From Notebooks and Diaries of the Period, ed. Leon Edel, New York, NY:  Farrar, Straus and Giroux, 1975
 Letters on Literature and Politics, ed. Elena Wilson, New York, NY:  Farrar, Straus and Giroux, 1977
 The Thirties: From Notebooks and Diaries of the Period, ed. Leon Edel, New York, NY:  Farrar, Straus and Giroux, 1980
 The Forties: From Notebooks and Diaries of the Period, ed. Leon Edel, New York, NY:  Farrar, Straus and Giroux, 1983
 The Portable Edmund Wilson, ed. Lewis M. Dabney., New York, NY: Viking Press, 1983
 .
 .
 .
 .
 .
 .
 .
 .

Fiction 
 "Galahad", 1927 (short story)  
 I Thought of Daisy, 1929 (novel)
 Memoirs of Hecate County, Garden City, NY, Doubleday, 1946 (short stories)

Plays 
 Cyprian's Prayer 1924
 The Crime in the Whispering Room 1927
 This Room and This Gin and These Sandwiches 1937 (original title "A Winter in Beech Street")
 Beppo and Beth 1937
 The Little Blue Light 1950
 Five Plays 1954 collects Cyprian's Prayer, The Crime in the Whispering Room, This Room and This Gin and These Sandwiches, Beppo and Beth, and The Little Blue Light.
 Dr. McGrath 1967
 The Duke of Palermo 1969
 Osbert's Career, or the Poet's Progress 1969

Book reviews

References

Sources
 .

External links

 .
 .
 
 Edmund Wilson Papers. Yale Collection of American Literature, Beinecke Rare Book and Manuscript Library.
 .
 .

 Lewis M. Dabney, Edmund Wilson: A Life in Literature, Farrar, Straus and Giroux, 0-374-11312-2

1895 births
1972 deaths
American male journalists
20th-century American journalists
American literary critics
United States Army personnel of World War I
20th-century American poets
American tax resisters
The Hill School alumni
The New Yorker people
The New Yorker critics
People from Red Bank, New Jersey
Princeton University alumni
Wesleyan University faculty
American male poets
Presidential Medal of Freedom recipients
The Hill School faculty
20th-century American male writers
20th-century American non-fiction writers
20th-century American educators
Lost Generation writers